is the 10th single by SKE48. It was released on September 19, 2012. It debuted in number one on the weekly Oricon Singles Chart with 511,472 copies sold.

Background 
Kaori Matsumura and Nanako Suga were selected to sing the title track for the first time. This was Yuka Nakanishi return to senbatsu, her last selected senbatsu was for 1! 2! 3! 4! Yoroshiku!.

Track listing

TYPE-A

TYPE-B

TYPE-C

Theater Edition

Members

Kiss Datte Hidarikiki 
Team S: Masana Oya, Yuria Kizaki, Akari Suda, Yuka Nakanishi, Jurina Matsui, Rena Matsui, Kumi Yagami, Nanako Suga
Team KII: Shiori Ogiso, Akane Takayanagi, Sawako Hata, Airi Furukawa, Manatsu Mukaida, Miki Yakata
Team E: Kanon Kimoto
Kenkyuusei: Kaori Matsumura

Taiikukan de Choushoku wo 
Team S: Mizuki Kuwabara, Kanako Hiramatsu
Team KII: Anna Ishida, Rina Matsumoto, Risako Goto, Riho Abiru, Mieko Sato, Tomoko Kato
Team E: Kyoka Isohara, Aya Shibata, Ami Kobayashi, Makiko Saito, Mikoto Uchiyama
Kenkyuusei: Tsugumi Iwanaga, Yuuna Ego, Sayaka Niidoi

Tori wa Aoi Sora no Hate wo Shiranai 
Team S: Rumi Kato, Yukiko Kinoshita, Shiori Takada, Aki Deguchi, Momona Kito
Team KII: Seira Sato, Shiori Iguchi
Team E: Kasumi Ueno, Madoka Umemoto, Shiori Kaneko, Mai Takeuchi, Minami Hara, Yukari Yamashita, Nao Furuhata
Kenkyuusei: Mitsuki Fujimoto, Emiri Kobayashi

Atto Iu Ma no Shoujo 
Team KII: Ririna Akaeda, Reika Yamada
Team E: Mei Sakai, Yumana Takagi, Rika Tsuzuki
Kenkyuusei: Narumi Ichino, Asana Inuzuka, Arisa Owaki, Risa Ogino, Miki Hioki, Haruka Futamura, Honoka Mizuno, Ami Miyamae, Mizuho Yamada

Kamigami no Ryouiki 
Team S: Masana Oya, Mizuki Kuwabara, Shiori Takada, Aki Deguchi, Yuka Nakanishi, Kanako Hiramatsu, Jurina Matsui, Rena Matsui, Kumi Yagami
Team KII: Seira Sato, Mieko Sato

References 

2012 singles
2012 songs
Avex Trax singles
Japanese-language songs
SKE48 songs
Oricon Weekly number-one singles
Billboard Japan Hot 100 number-one singles